Barry Mulholland (14 June 1940 – 28 April 2006) was an Australian racing driver.

While a skilled racing driver, Mulholland was more infamously known as Bruce McPhee's 'contractual obligation' co-driver. In endurance production touring cars McPhee raced in during the 1960s which required two drivers, Mulholland would drive one lap at approximate mid-distance before handing the car back to McPhee. Mulholland holds the record for fewest completed laps to win a Bathurst 500 when he co-drove with McPhee to win the 1968 Bathurst 500.  (Current rules limit driving to 3 hours, 30 minutes of consecutive driving, and a maximum distance a driver may run, and since 1987, a driver must complete between 54 and 107 laps each, with no driver completing more than two-thirds distance, 107 laps currently, of the race.) Mulholland later owned the car that won the race in 1968, and died aged 65.

Mulholland drove just 5 racing laps in the Bathurst 500 between 1963 and 1968 (missing the 1967 race), with the enviable finishing record of 6th (1964), 2nd (1965), 3rd (1966), 1st (1968) and finally 2nd in 1969.

Career results

Complete Bathurst 500 results

Notes

Australian racing drivers
Bathurst 1000 winners
1940 births
2006 deaths